The 1956–57 West Virginia Mountaineers men's basketball team represented West Virginia University in NCAA college basketball competition in the 1956–57 season. Coached by Fred Schaus and competing in the Southern Conference, the Mountaineers started the season strong, beating their first eight opponents, which included 19th-ranked NC State. However, in the 1956 Dixie Classic, the undefeated streak fell apart, and West Virginia lost all three of their tournament games. The team regrouped and won their next 11, only losing one more game in the regular season. They cruised through the Southern Conference tournament, beating Davidson, Richmond, and Washington & Lee each by double-digit margins for their third consecutive Southern Conference championship. Their season came to an end when 20th-ranked Canisius felled them in the first round of the NCAA tournament.

References

External links
 Stats via Sports Reference

West Virginia Mountaineers men's basketball seasons
Southern Conference men's basketball champion seasons
West Virginia
West Virginia Mountaineers men's b
West Virginia Mountaineers men's b